The 1977 Volta a Catalunya was the 57th edition of the Volta a Catalunya cycle race and was held from 7 to 14 September 1977. The race started and finished in Sitges. The race was won by Freddy Maertens of the  team.

General classification

References

1977
Volta
1977 in Spanish road cycling
September 1977 sports events in Europe